is a Japanese footballer who plays for Nankatsu SC.

Career
Shinichiro Kawamata joined J1 League club; Kashima Antlers in 2008. In 2011, he moved Vegalta Sendai. In 2012, he backed to Kashima Antlers. 25 May 2016, he debuted in J.League Cup (v Júbilo Iwata).

In January 2020, Kawamata joined Nankatsu SC.

Club statistics
Updated to end of 2018 season.

References

External links

Profile at Kashima Antlers

1989 births
Living people
Association football people from Shizuoka Prefecture
Japanese footballers
J1 League players
Kashima Antlers players
Vegalta Sendai players
Association football goalkeepers